Flávio Beck Júnior (born 14 March 1987) is a Brazilian professional footballer who plays as an midfielder.

Career
After playing in Brazil during his youth career, he came to Croatia in 2006 starting his senior career at a lower league Solin. After a short spell with German side Energie Cottbus he signed with Albanian Superliga side Flamurtari. In the second half of the 2008–09 season he played with Široki Brijeg in the Bosnian Premier League. Afterwards, he had another spell with Flamurtari before joining Maribor in the Slovenian PrvaLiga. During the season 2010–11 he played with Bargh Shiraz in the Azadegan League, Iranian second level, before returning to Europe in summer 2011 to sign with Montenegrin top league side Bodućnost Podgorica.

In June 2013, Beck signed for Azerbaijan Premier League side Inter Baku. After only four league games for the club Beck was told he could leave the club in December 2013. However Beck was still being left in the reserves come April after a disagreement between the club's manager, Kakhaber Tskhadadze, and Becks agent. At the end of July 2014, Beck re-signed for Bodućnost Podgorica. In early September 2015 he signed with another Montenegrin top-flight club, Lovćen.

On 15 January 2019, Beck signed a one-year contract with Malaysia Premier League side Kelantan.

Personal life
In 2013, he became a Croatian citizen.

Career statistics

Club

Honours 
Maribor
Slovenian Cup (1): 2009–10
Budućnost Podgorica
1. CFL (1): 2011–12
Montenegrin Cup (1): 2012–13

References

External links

1987 births
Living people
Brazilian footballers
Association football midfielders
Association football forwards
Brazilian expatriate footballers
First Football League (Croatia) players
Second Football League (Croatia) players
Bundesliga players
Kategoria Superiore players
Premier League of Bosnia and Herzegovina players
Slovenian PrvaLiga players
Azadegan League players
Montenegrin First League players
Azerbaijan Premier League players
Liga 1 (Indonesia) players
Malaysia Super League players
Malaysia Premier League players
NK Solin players
FC Energie Cottbus players
Flamurtari Vlorë players
NK Maribor players
NK Široki Brijeg players
Bargh Shiraz players
FK Budućnost Podgorica players
Shamakhi FK players
FK Lovćen players
Borneo F.C. players
Negeri Sembilan FA players
Kelantan FA players
Bhayangkara F.C. players
Semen Padang F.C. players
PSIS Semarang players
OFK Petrovac players
NK Novigrad players
Expatriate footballers in Croatia
Brazilian expatriate sportspeople in Croatia
Expatriate footballers in Germany
Brazilian expatriate sportspeople in Germany
Expatriate footballers in Albania
Brazilian expatriate sportspeople in Albania
Expatriate footballers in Slovenia
Brazilian expatriate sportspeople in Slovenia
Expatriate footballers in Bosnia and Herzegovina
Brazilian expatriate sportspeople in Bosnia and Herzegovina
Expatriate footballers in Iran
Brazilian expatriate sportspeople in Iran
Expatriate footballers in Montenegro
Brazilian expatriate sportspeople in Montenegro
Expatriate footballers in Azerbaijan
Brazilian expatriate sportspeople in Azerbaijan
Expatriate footballers in Indonesia
Brazilian expatriate sportspeople in Indonesia
Expatriate footballers in Malaysia
Brazilian expatriate sportspeople in Malaysia
Brazilian people of German descent
Croatian people of German descent
Croatian people of Brazilian descent
Naturalized citizens of Croatia